Center for Reproductive Law and Policy v. Bush, 304 F.3d 183 (2d Cir. 2002), was a case in which the United States Court of Appeals for the Second Circuit upheld the Bush Administration's re-imposition of the Mexico City Policy, which states that "the United States will no longer contribute to separate nongovernmental organizations which perform or actively promote abortion as a method of family planning in other nations."

Background
The Foreign Assistance Act provided the president the option of not funding abortions through the United States Agency for International Development. After the election, the George W. Bush Administration re-imposed the policy and the Center for Reproductive Law and Policy sued.

Decision
The decision was written by then-Judge Sonia Sotomayor, who wrote that the policy did not constitute a violation of equal protection, as "the government is free to favor the anti-abortion position over the pro-choice position, and can do so with public funds".

United States abortion case law
United States Court of Appeals for the Second Circuit cases
2002 in United States case law
United States Agency for International Development